EV6 may refer to:

 EV6 The Rivers Route, a EuroVelo long-distance cycling route
 Kia EV6, a 2021–present South Korean electric compact SUV
 Skyworth EV6, a 2021–present Chinese electric mid-size SUV
 EV6 bus, a microprocessor bus used by some Alpha and AMD CPUs